The Oakville Fall Classic (formerly the Cameron's Brewing Oakville Fall Classic and the Biosteel Oakville Fall Classic) is an annual bonspiel on the men's and women's World Curling Tour and Ontario Curling Tour. It is held annually in September at the Oakville Curling Club in Oakville, Ontario.

Past champions

Men

Women

References

Ontario Curling Tour events
World Curling Tour events
Women's World Curling Tour events
Oakville, Ontario